The 2022 Ashleigh Barty tennis season officially began on 3 January 2022 as the start of the 2022 WTA Tour. Ashleigh Barty entered the season as world number 1 player in singles for the third year in a row. She announced retirement on 23 March 2022.

All matches

Singles matches

Doubles matches

Tournament schedule

Singles schedule

Doubles schedule

Yearly records

Top 10 wins

Singles

Doubles

Finals

Singles: 2 (2 titles)

Double: 1 (1 title)

Earnings

References

External links

 
 
 
 

2022 in Australian tennis
2022 tennis player seasons
Ashleigh Barty tennis seasons